Mouhamed N'Diaye (born 21 March 1996) is a Senegalese football defender who plays for the Oslo Football Academy.

References

1996 births
Living people
Senegalese footballers
Senegal international footballers
Association football defenders